Michael Begley (22 August 1932 – 26 March 2012) was an Irish Fine Gael politician who served as Minister of State at the Department of Trade, Commerce and Tourism from 1981 to 1982, Parliamentary Secretary to the Minister for Finance from 1975 to 1977 and Parliamentary Secretary to the Minister for Local Government from 1973 to 1975. He served as a Teachta Dála (TD) for the Kerry South constituency from 1969 to 1989.

Born in Dingle, County Kerry, in 1932, to a farming family. Begley was a carpenter and secondary school teacher before entering national politics.

Prior to his election as a TD, Begley was elected to Kerry County Council and subsequently served as chairman of the council in 1966–67.  He was first elected to Dáil Éireann on his third attempt at the 1969 general election for Kerry South. Four years later in 1973, Fine Gael came to power in coalition government with the Labour Party and Begley was appointed as Minister of State with responsibility for Local Government. In 1975, Begley became Parliamentary Secretary to the Minister for Finance following the death of Henry Kenny. He served in that position until 1977.

In 1981, he became a Junior Minister for the Department of Industry and Commerce in the government of Garret FitzGerald. He served in this capacity until 1982 when the government fell. Begley remained a TD until losing his seat at the 1989 general election to the Labour Party's Michael Moynihan. He then retired from politics.

Michael Begley died aged 79. Tributes were paid among many politicians including Taoiseach Enda Kenny and Tánaiste Eamon Gilmore.

References

1932 births
2012 deaths
Fine Gael TDs
Members of the 19th Dáil
Members of the 20th Dáil
Members of the 21st Dáil
Members of the 22nd Dáil
Members of the 23rd Dáil
Members of the 24th Dáil
Members of the 25th Dáil
Local councillors in County Kerry
Politicians from County Kerry
Ministers of State of the 22nd Dáil
Parliamentary Secretaries of the 20th Dáil
People from Dingle